The 1990–91 Hong Kong First Division League season was the 80th since its establishment.

League table

References
1990–91 Hong Kong First Division table (RSSSF)

Hong Kong First Division League seasons
Hong Kong First Division League, 1995-96
First Division